This is a list of United States governors who died in office.

List

 Died in office